Men of the Night is a 1934 American drama film written and directed by Lambert Hillyer, which stars Bruce Cabot, Judith Allen, and Ward Bond.

Cast list

 Bruce Cabot as Detective Sergeant "Stake-Out" Kelly
 Judith Allen as Mary Higgins
 Ward Bond as Detective John Connors
 Charles Sabin as Packey Davis
 John Kelly as Chuck
 Arthur Rankin as Pat Smith
 Matthew Betz as Schmidt
 Walter McGrail as Louie
 Maidel Turner as Mrs. Webley
 Charles C. Wilson as Benson
 Frank Darien as Mr. Webley
 Harry Holman as Fat man at pig stand
 James Wang as Owner of the chop suey parlor
 Al Hill as Holdup man
 Louis Natheaux as Holdup man
 Eddie Foster as Pedro
 Frank Marlowe as Gas station attendant
 Gladys Gale as Mrs. Everett
 Robert Graves as Mr. Everett
 Pearl Eaton as Ethel
 Frank Meredith as Motorcycle officer
 Jack Mack as Bill
 Tom London as Dave Burns
 Dick Rush as Conductor
 Lucille Ball as Peggy
 Frank O'Connor as Boss painter
 Lee Shumway as Detective
 Mitchell Ingraham as Telegraph operator
 Jack King as Newsboy
 Matty Roubert as Newsboy
 Ernie Adams as Sandy
 Charles McMurphy as Policeman
 Bruce Randall as Policecar driver
 Dutch Hendrian as Henchman
 Herman Marks as Crook

References

External links
 
 
 

Columbia Pictures films
Films directed by Lambert Hillyer
1934 drama films
1934 films
American drama films
American black-and-white films
1930s American films